The 2019 Pacific-Asia Curling Championships was held from November 2 to 9 at the Shenzhen Universiade Sports Center in Shenzhen, China. The top men's team and the top two women's teams qualified for the 2020 World Men's Curling Championship and 2020 World Women's Curling Championship respectively. The next two placed teams of each gender qualified for the World Qualification Event, a chance to qualify for the World Curling Championships.

Medalists

Men

Teams

The teams are listed as follows:

Round-robin standings
Final round-robin standings

Round-robin results

All draw times are listed in China Standard Time (UTC+08:00).

Draw 1
Saturday, November 2, 14:00

Draw 2
Sunday, November 3, 09:00

Draw 3
Sunday, November 3, 19:00

Draw 4
Monday, November 4, 14:00

Draw 5
Tuesday, November 5, 09:00

Draw 6
Tuesday, November 5, 19:00

Draw 7
Wednesday, November 6, 09:00

Draw 8
Wednesday, November 6, 19:00

Draw 9
Thursday, November 7, 14:00

Playoffs

Semifinals
Friday, November 8, 09:00

Friday, November 8, 14:00

Bronze-medal game
Saturday, November 9, 10:00

Gold-medal game
Saturday, November 9, 14:00

Women

Teams

The teams are listed as follows:

Round-robin standings
Final round-robin standings

Round-robin results

All draw times are listed in China Standard Time (UTC+08:00).

Draw 1
Saturday, November 2, 19:00

Draw 2
Sunday, November 3, 14:00

Draw 3
Monday, November 4, 09:00

Draw 4
Monday, November 4, 19:00

Draw 5
Tuesday, November 5, 14:00

Draw 6
Wednesday, November 6, 14:00

Draw 7
Thursday, November 7, 09:00

Playoffs

Semifinals
Thursday, November 7, 19:00

Friday, November 8, 09:00

Bronze-medal game
Friday, November 8, 19:00

Gold-medal game
Saturday, November 9, 10:00

References

External links

Pacific-Asia Curling Championships
Pacific-Asia Curling Championships
Pacific-Asia Curling Championships
Pacific-Asia Curling Championships
International curling competitions hosted by China
Sport in Shenzhen